Windom is a city in Cottonwood County, Minnesota, United States.  The population was 4,646 at the 2010 census.  It is the county seat of Cottonwood County and is situated in the Coteau des Prairies.

Although it is a small, rural farming community, Windom is host to several parks including a disc golf course at Mayflower Park.  The Des Moines River flows through Windom and serves as a gentle, rapid-free canoeing spot.

History
Windom was platted on June 20, 1871, by A.L. Beach, an engineer for the Sioux City and St. Paul Railroad. Twelve lots were created and sold for $100 on the first day. It was incorporated as a village in 1875 and reincorporated on September 9, 1884. Judson W. Bishop named the city after William Windom, who served as a United States senator from Minnesota from 1881 to 1883 and was United States Secretary of the Treasury under Presidents James Garfield, Chester Arthur and Benjamin Harrison.

Geography
Windom is on the Coteau des Prairies, a ridge extending from South Dakota to Iowa separating Cottonwood County into two watersheds. The watersheds drain into the Minnesota and Mississippi rivers. The Des Moines River flows through Windom.

Climate

Demographics

2010 census
As of the census of 2010, there were 4,646 people, 1,994 households, and 1,201 families residing in the city. The racial makeup of the city was 92.1% White, 1.4% African American, 0.3% Native American, 1.2% Asian, 0.3% Pacific Islander, 3.7% from other races, and 1.1% from two or more races. Hispanic or Latino of any race were 8.0% of the population.

There were 1,994 households, of which 26.9% had children under the age of 18 living with them, 47.4% were married couples living together, 9.4% had a female householder with no husband present, 3.5% had a male householder with no wife present, and 39.8% were non-families. 35.7% of all households were made up of individuals, and 16.3% had someone living alone who was 65 years of age or older. The average household size was 2.25 and the average family size was 2.91.

The median age in the city was 42.6 years. 23.2% of residents were under the age of 18; 6.8% were between the ages of 18 and 24; 23.1% were from 25 to 44; 25.8% were from 45 to 64; and 21.2% were 65 years of age or older. The gender makeup of the city was 48.2% male and 51.8% female.

2000 census
As of the census of 2000, there were 4,490 people, 1,910 households, and 1,195 families residing in the city. The racial makeup of the city was 97.15% White, 0.24% African American, 0.33% Native American, 0.71% Asian, 0.11% Pacific Islander, 0.85% from other races, and 0.60% from two or more races. Hispanic or Latino of any race were 1.58% of the population.

There were 1,910 households, out of which 27.7% had children under the age of 18 living with them, 50.6% were married couples living together, 8.9% had a female householder with no husband present, and 37.4% were non-families. 34.0% of all households were made up of individuals, and 17.2% had someone living alone who was 65 years of age or older. The average household size was 2.25 and the average family size was 2.87.

In the city, the population was spread out, with 23.7% under the age of 18, 6.6% from 18 to 24, 24.4% from 25 to 44, 23.6% from 45 to 64, and 21.7% who were 65 years of age or older.  The median age was 42 years. For every 100 females, there were 87.6 males.  For every 100 females age 18 and over, there were 84.7 males.

The median income for a household in the city was $30,744, and the median income for a family was $43,350. Males had a median income of $30,053 versus $21,270 for females. The per capita income for the city was $17,155.  About 5.7% of families and 9.6% of the population were below the poverty line, including 13.1% of those under age 18 and 11.0% of those age 65 or over.

Government
Windom is in Minnesota's 7th congressional district, represented by Michelle Fischbach, a Republican. At the state level, Windom is in Senate District 22, represented by Republican Bill Weber, and in House District 22B, represented by Republican Rod Hamilton.

Windom operates under a Mayor-Council plan. The council consists of 5 members representing two wards that are each separated into two precincts. Four of the council members represent an individual precinct and serve four-year terms; the fifth is an at-large candidate and serves a two-year term. Before a new city charter was introduced on June 20, 1984, council members in Windom were called alderpersons.

The mayor of Windom is Dominic Jones.

Infrastructure

Transportation

U.S. Highway 71, Minnesota Highway 60, and Minnesota Highway 62 are three of the main routes through the city.

Economy
On December 1, 1987, Windom adopted the Minnesota "Star City" program to promote economic development and pursue the "Star City" designation. The city received the designation in August 1988.

Windom's largest employers are Toro, Windom Public Schools-ISD 177, and Fortune Transportation with 600, 176, and 175 employees respectively. Windom is home to one of eight Toro manufacturing facilities. It is also the headquarters of Big Game Treestands.

Windom has a labor force of 2,378, of whom 2,295 are employed; 85 are unemployed, creating an unemployment rate of 3.5%. The largest industries are educational services, health care and social assistance, with 26.3% of the employed population, and manufacturing, with 18.6% of the employed population.

Media
The town is served by the Cottonwood County Citizen, a weekly newspaper.

The town is also served by three radio stations licensed to the town, two commercial and one non-commercial.

Education
Windom is home to several schools: Windom Area Middle/High School, Winfair Elementary School, Bridges Preschool and Red Rock Ridge ALC. It also has two private or church preschools: Busy Bees and Sunshine School.

Windom Area Middle/High School
Windom Area Middle/High School is home to students grade 4-12 due to renovations in 2003. The building originally only housed grades 5-12 after the renovations, but had to accommodate 4th-grade students starting in 2011 due to overcrowding in the elementary school building. Roughly 300 students attend the high school (grades 9-12) and 350 attend the middle school (grades 4-8). The school is led by Principal Bryan Joyce and Superintendent Jamie Frank.

Entertainment

Riverfest
Windom holds an annual summer festival, Riverfest, during the second weekend of June. A pageant crowns a Miss Riverfest, a First Runner-Up, Miss Photogenic, Miss Congeniality and a Little Miss Riverfest. Other activities include fireworks, Vickie Schendel 5K Walk/Run, tennis tourney, fishing tourney, turtle races, kiddie tractor pull, street dance, and a grand parade.

Winter-River-Fest
In February 2011 Windom started a new festival, "Winter-River-Fest." Activities included a chili feed, open fires, dodgeball, snow sculpting, and the Darn Cold Croquet Contest.

Notable people
Larry Buhler - Professional football player
Shorty Elness - Professional football player
Dennis C. Frederickson - businessman, Minnesota state legislator, and Mayor of Windom
Elaine Harder - Minnesota state legislator
Aaron Horkey - Artist
Johnny Olson - Game show announcer
Maria Schneider - Grammy Award-winning jazz composer

References
 Brown, John A.  History of Cottonwood and Watonwan Counties, Minnesota: Their People, Industries, and Institutions.  B.F. Bowen & Co.: Indianapolis, 1916.

External links

 City of Windom
 Finding Windom Community Guide
 Historic photographs

Cities in Cottonwood County, Minnesota
Cities in Minnesota
County seats in Minnesota
Populated places established in 1871
1871 establishments in Minnesota